The 1932 Irish general election to the 7th Dáil was held on Tuesday, 16 February, just over two weeks after the dissolution of the 6th Dáil on 29 January. The general election took place in 30 parliamentary constituencies throughout the Irish Free State for 153 seats in Dáil Éireann. It was the first election held in the Irish Free State since the Statute of Westminster a year earlier removed the United Kingdom parliament's authority to legislate for the Dominions, including the Irish Free State.

The 7th Dáil met at Leinster House on 9 March 1932 to nominate the President of the Executive Council and Executive Council of the Irish Free State for appointment by the Governor-General James McNeill. This resulted in the first change of government in the Irish Free State. Cumann na nGaedheal, which had been the governing party since 1922, was succeeded by Fianna Fáil, which became the largest party in the chamber and formed a government led by Éamon de Valera, with the support of the Labour Party. Fianna Fáil would be the largest party in Dáil Éireann at every general election thereafter until 2011.

Campaign
The election campaign between the two ideologically opposed parties was reasonably peaceful. However, during the campaign the government prosecuted de Valera's newly established newspaper, The Irish Press. The editor was also brought before a military tribunal. This was seen by many as a major blunder and a serious infringement on the belief of freedom of speech. The "red scare" tactics also seemed to backfire on the government.

Two days before the election, Patrick Reynolds, a Cumann na nGaedheal TD was assassinated in Ballinamore. A garda detective was murdered in the same incident. The poll in Leitrim–Sligo was postponed and Reynolds' widow Mary was elected.

Cumann na nGaedheal

 
Cumann na nGaedheal fought the general election on its record of providing ten years of stable government. The party claimed to have brought stability following the chaos of the Irish Civil War and to have provided honest government. However, by 1932 this provision of solid government was wearing thin, particularly since the party had no solution to the collapse in trade which followed the depression of the early 1930s. Instead of offering new policies, the party believed that its record in government would be enough to retain power. Cumann na nGaedheal also played the "red scare" tactic, describing Fianna Fáil as communists and likening Éamon de Valera to Joseph Stalin.

Fianna Fáil
In comparison to Cumann na nGaedheal, Fianna Fáil had an elaborate election programme, designed to appeal to a wide section of the electorate. It played down its republicanism to avoid alarm, but provided very popular social and economic policies. The party promised to free IRA prisoners, abolish the Oath of allegiance and reduce the powers of the Governor-General and the Senate. It also promised the introduction of protectionist policies, industrial development, self-sufficiency and improvements in housing and social security benefits.

Result

|}

Voting summary

Seats summary

Government formation
Fianna Fáil was five seats short of an overall majority, but it still looked like the only party capable of forming a government. Discussions got underway immediately after the election and an agreement was reached in which the Labour Party would support Fianna Fáil. The party now had the necessary votes to form a minority government. After the results were announced, newly elected Fianna Fáil TD Seán Moylan proclaimed that the election was a victory of "the owners of the donkey and cart over the pony and trap class".

On 9 March 1932 the first change of government in the Irish Free State took place. Many in the country and abroad wondered if the true test of democracy would be passed, whether it would be possible for the men who won a civil war only ten years before to hand over power to their opponents. Similar to when the party first entered the Dáil in 1927, a number of Fianna Fáil TDs had guns in their pockets. However, the feared coup d'état did not take place. W. T. Cosgrave was determined to adhere to the principles of democracy that he had practised while in government. Likewise, the army, Garda Síochána and the civil service all accepted the change of government, despite the fact that they would now be taking orders from men who had been their enemies less than ten years previously. After a brief and uneventful meeting in the Dáil chamber, Éamon de Valera was appointed President of the Executive Council of the Irish Free State by the Governor-General, James McNeill, who had come to Leinster House to make the appointment rather than require de Valera travel to the Viceregal Lodge, formerly a symbol of British rule. He formed the 6th Executive Council of the Irish Free State. Fianna Fáil, a party led by many of the men most closely identified with opposing the existence of the state ten years earlier, were now the party of government. The 1932 general election was the beginning of a sixteen-year period in government for Fianna Fáil.

Membership changes

First time TDs
Brian Brady
Gerald Bartley
William Broderick
William Browne
Patrick Burke
Thomas Dowdall
Francis Gormley
James Kelly
Raphael Keyes
John Kiersey
Conor Maguire
Sydney Minch
Edward Moane
Patrick Murphy
Fred McDonogh
Eugene O'Brien
Patrick O'Hara
James Reidy
Robert Ryan

Outgoing TDs
William Aird (Deceased)
Edmond Carey (Lost seat)
Michael Connolly (Lost seat)
Peter de Loughry (Retired)
William Kent (Lost seat)
Michael Óg McFadden (Lost seat)
Arthur Matthews (Lost seat)
Thomas Mullins (Retired)
Martin McDonogh (Lost seat)
Thomas J. O'Connell (Lost seat)
Patrick O'Dowd (Lost seat)

Notes

References

 
General election, 1932
General election, 1932
1932
7th Dáil
February 1932 events